The Monastery of the Assumption of the Most Holy Mother of God in Himmelsthür is a Serbian Orthodox monastery of the Diocese of Düsseldorf in Himmelsthür, Germany.

The monastery was built on the ruins of an evangelical church built at the end of the 19th century. In 1979, it became the spiritual point of Serbs in Germany. The parish near the monastery, which includes Hildesheim, Hameln, Goslar and Holzminden, has about 150 registered households, which help the monastery permanently or occasionally.

In 1972, the Serbian Orthodox Church opened the Diocesan Center in the renovated building of the former Evangelical Church in Düsseldorf. Together with the church, in 1978 two buildings were bought in Himmelstir. With the blessing of Bishop Lavrentije Trifunović, they were rearranged for the needs of founding the monastery.

Despite the opening of the diocesan office in Munich, the monastery remained the seat of the then Central European Diocese. It often hosts church gatherings and symposiums, exhibitions of paintings and lectures. The Assembly of Serbian Youth of Western Europe is held regularly.

The monastery also has a workshop for making candles, and the whole complex is decorated with a beautifully gate with a tree line and a garden.

History and architecture 
The church was built from 1902 to 1904 by Adelbert Hotzen  built as a chapel of the Protestant Church of Frauenheims Himmelsthür founded by Pastor Bernhard Isermeyer.  It is a Neo-Gothic Brick-Saalkirche with a retracted polygonal closing chancel and roof turret. Under the church there are two basement floors, which originally served as ironing and sorting rooms for the diaconal facility.  The last Protestant service was celebrated in the old asylum church on September 9, 1977. 

In 1978 the Serbian Orthodox Diocese for Central Europe bought the church and the adjoining buildings and set up their bishopric with a monastery and meeting center there. After the redesign for the  Orthodox Liturgy, especially the decoration with Iconostasis and Icon n, the church was given the title Dormition of the All Holy Theotokos consecrated. In 1992 it also became parish church.  with pictures of the liturgy on August 28; on this  Gregorian date the  15. August according to  Julian calendar calculation. With the establishment of the  Diocese Austria-Switzerland in 2010/2011, the Alpine countries became the responsibility of the previous diocese Central Europe removed. 

In 2015 the church lost its status as an episcopal church. Meanwhile, Düsseldorf is the seat of the diocese.

References

Serbian Orthodox monasteries